The Mercer protocol is a common regimen for antibiotic prophylaxis in the context of preterm premature rupture of membranes (PPROM) during pregnancy, when immediate delivery is contraindicated due to known or suspected fetal lung immaturity.  It was first described by Mercer et al. in 1997.

Regimen
The protocol consists of two stages.  First, intravenously administer ampicillin (2 g) and erythromycin (250 mg) every 6 hours for 48 hours.  After 48 hours, administer oral amoxicillin (250 mg) and erythromycin (333 mg) every 8 hours for 5 days.

References

Antibiotics